The Murchison Glacier is an  long glacier flowing through Aoraki / Mount Cook National Park in the South Island of New Zealand. Lying to the east of the Malte Brun range and west of the Liebig Range, high in the Southern Alps, it flows from the Tasman Saddle at 2,435 m mostly southwestwards to around 1,110 m. The Murchison River, which takes its meltwater, flows under the larger Tasman Glacier to the south.

See also
 List of glaciers

References

Glaciers of New Zealand
Landforms of Canterbury, New Zealand